Kerem Ben Shemen (lit. very fruitful vineyard), also known as Ben Shemen-Shikhun (lit. Ben Shemen Housing Complex) is a moshav in central Israel. Located near Lod, it falls under the jurisdiction of Hevel Modi'in Regional Council.

History
The moshav was established in 1923 when Ben Shemen was split in two, with a group of trial farms eventually becoming a separate moshav, Kerem Ben Shemen. Its name is taken from Isaiah 5:1: "My well-beloved had a vineyard in a very fruitful hill."

References

Moshavim
Populated places established in 1923
Populated places in Central District (Israel)
1923 establishments in Mandatory Palestine